The Flirting Widow is a 1930 American pre-Code comedy film directed by William A. Seiter and starring Dorothy Mackaill, Basil Rathbone, Leila Hyams and Claude Gillingwater. It was produced and released by First National Pictures, a subsidiary of Warner Bros.

The film's plot is based on the story Green Stockings by A. E. W. Mason. The film was remade in 1933 as Her Imaginary Lover at the Teddington Studios, the British branch of Warner Bros.-First National Productions.

Plot
William Faraday refuses to let his youngest daughter, Evelyn, get married before her older sister, Celia. Celia, who has no interest in getting married, takes pity on Evelyn and her suitor Bobby and pretends to have gotten engaged to Colonel John Smith during a short vacation away from home. To avoid difficulties, she states that Smith has sailed to join the British Field Force in Arabia. When her father receives this news, he  consents to Evelyn's marriage.

At Evelyn's insistence, Celia writes a love letter to her fiancé, never intending to send it. She later burns the magazine in which she hid the letter, unaware someone has posted it already. The letter is received by a real Colonel Smith stationed in Arabia. He is amused and curious.

After Evelyn's marriage, Celia publishes a death notice in the London Daily Times for her Colonel Smith. The real Smith decides to pay a visit to Celia, pretending to be a close friend of the deceased bringing some mementos. When he gives them to Celia, she is uncomfortable. She eventually realizes "Colonel Vaughan" is not who he says he is, but over the course of a single night, they fall in love.

Cast
 Dorothy Mackaill as Celia
 Basil Rathbone as Colonel Smith
 Leila Hyams as Evelyn
 William Austin as James Raleigh
 Claude Gillingwater as Faraday
 Emily Fitzroy as Aunt Ida
 Flora Bramley as Phyllis
 Anthony Bushell as Bobby
 Wilfred Noy as Martin

Box office
According to Warner Bros., the film earned $234,000 domestically and $114,000 from foreign showings.

Preservation
The film survives intact and has been broadcast on both television and cable. It is also preserved in the Library of Congress collection.

References

External links
 
 
 
 

1930 films
1930 romantic comedy films
American black-and-white films
American romantic comedy films
Films based on short fiction
Films directed by William A. Seiter
Films set in England
First National Pictures films
Warner Bros. films
1930s English-language films
1930s American films